Sonneratia hainanensis, the Hainan sonneratia, is a species of plant in the family Lythraceae.

It is endemic to Hainan island/province in southeastern China.

References

hainanensis
Endemic flora of China
Flora of Hainan
Critically endangered flora of Asia
Taxonomy articles created by Polbot